Mehdi Lazaar (born 9 March 1993) is a Belgian professional footballer who plays as a forward.

Career
On 7 September 2021, Lazaar joined Eerste Divisie club MVV Maastricht on a one-year deal after a successful trial. He made his debut for the club three days later, coming on as a half-time substitute for Mitchy Ntelo in a 7–1 defeat away against Emmen. At the end of the season his contract was not renewed, and he left the club as a free agent.

Personal life
Born in Belgium, Lazaar is of Moroccan descent.

References

External links

Burnley profile

1993 births
Living people
Belgian footballers
Belgian expatriate footballers
Belgian sportspeople of Moroccan descent
Sint-Truidense V.V. players
R.E. Virton players
MVV Maastricht players
Belgian Pro League players
Challenger Pro League players
Eerste Divisie players
Association football defenders
People from Duffel
Footballers from Antwerp Province
Expatriate footballers in the Netherlands
Belgian expatriate sportspeople in the Netherlands